Seoce, which translates as villages from Serbo-Croatian,  may refer to:

 Seoce, Serbia, a village near Kuršumlija, Serbia
 Seoce (Breza), a village near Breza, Bosnia and Herzegovina
 Seoce (Kakanj), a village near Kakanj, Bosnia and Herzegovina
 , a village near Nova Kapela

See also
 Seoca (disambiguation) (Cyrl: Селце)
 Selce (disambiguation) (Cyrl: Селце)
 Selca (disambiguation) (Cyrl: Селце)